The following outline is provided as an overview of and topical guide to the Internet.

Internet – worldwide, publicly accessible network of interconnected computer networks that transmit data by packet switching using the standard Internet Protocol (IP). It is a "network of networks" that consists of millions of interconnected smaller domestic, academic, business, and government networks, which together carry various information and services, such as electronic mail, online chat, file transfer, and the interlinked Web pages and other documents of the World Wide Web.

Internet features

 Hosting –
 File hosting –
 Web hosting
 E-mail hosting
 DNS hosting
 Game servers
 Wiki farms
 World Wide Web –
 Websites –
 Web applications –
 Webmail –
 Online shopping –
 Online auctions –
 Webcomics –
 Wikis –
 Voice over IP
 IPTV

Internet communication technology

Internet infrastructure 
 Critical Internet infrastructure – 
 Internet access – 
 Internet access in the United States – 
 Internet service provider – 
 Internet backbone – 
 Internet exchange point (IXP) – 
 Internet standard – 
 Request for Comments (RFC) –

Internet communication protocols

Internet protocol suite –

Link layer 

Link layer –
Address Resolution Protocol (ARP/InARP) – 
Neighbor Discovery Protocol (NDP) – 
Open Shortest Path First (OSPF) – 
Tunneling protocol (Tunnels) –
 Layer 2 Tunneling Protocol (L2TP) – 
Point-to-Point Protocol (PPP) – 
Media Access Control –
Ethernet – 
Digital subscriber line (DSL) – 
Integrated Services Digital Network (ISDN) – 
Fiber Distributed Data Interface (FDDI) –

Internet layer 

Internet layer –
Internet Protocol (IP) – 
 IPv4 – 
 IPv6 – 
Internet Control Message Protocol (ICMP) – 
ICMPv6 – 
Internet Group Management Protocol (IGMP) – 
IPsec –

Transport layer 

Transport layer –
Transmission Control Protocol (TCP) – 
User Datagram Protocol (UDP) – 
Datagram Congestion Control Protocol (DCCP) – 
Stream Control Transmission Protocol (SCTP) – 
Resource reservation protocol (RSVP) – 
Explicit Congestion Notification (ECN) –
QUIC

Application layer 

Application layer –
Border Gateway Protocol (BGP) – 
Dynamic Host Configuration Protocol (DHCP) – 
Domain Name System (DNS) – 
File Transfer Protocol (FTP) – 
Hypertext Transfer Protocol (HTTP) – 
Internet Message Access Protocol (IMAP) – 
Internet Relay Chat (IRC) – 
LDAP – 
Media Gateway Control Protocol (MGCP) – 
Network News Transfer Protocol (NNTP) – 
Network Time Protocol (NTP) – 
Post Office Protocol (POP) – 
Routing Information Protocol (RIP) – 
Remote procedure call (RPC) – 
Real-time Transport Protocol (RTP) – 
Session Initiation Protocol (SIP) – 
Simple Mail Transfer Protocol (SMTP) – 
Simple Network Management Protocol (SNMP) – 
SOCKS – 
Secure Shell (SSH) – 
Telnet – 
Transport Layer Security (TLS/SSL) – 
Extensible Messaging and Presence Protocol (XMPP) –

History of the Internet
History of the Internet
The internet wasn't invented but continually developed by internet pioneers.
 Predecessors
 NPL network –  a local area computer network operated by a team from the National Physical Laboratory in England that pioneered the concept of packet switching.
 ARPANET – an early packet switching network and the first network to implement the protocol suite TCP/IP which later became a technical foundation of the Internet.
 Merit Network – a computer network created in 1966 to connect the mainframe computers at universities that is currently the oldest running regional computer network in the United States.
 CYCLADES – a French research network created in the early 1970s that pioneered the concept of packet switching, and was developed to explore alternatives to the ARPANET design.
 Computer Science Network (CSNET) – a computer network created in the United States for computer science departments at academic and research institutions that could not be directly connected to ARPANET, due to funding or authorization limitations. It played a significant role in spreading awareness of, and access to, national networking and was a major milestone on the path to development of the global Internet.
 National Science Foundation Network (NSFNET) – 
 History of Internet components
 History of packet switching – 
 very high speed Backbone Network Service (vBNS) – 
 Network access point (NAP) – 
 Federal Internet Exchange (FIX) – 
 Commercial Internet eXchange (CIX) –
 Timeline of Internet conflicts

Internet usage
 Global Internet usage
 Internet traffic
 List of countries by number of Internet users
 List of European countries by number of Internet users
 List of sovereign states by number of broadband Internet subscriptions
 List of sovereign states by number of Internet hosts
 Languages used on the Internet
 List of countries by IPv4 address allocation
 Internet Census of 2012

Internet politics 
 Internet privacy – a subset of data privacy concerning the right to privacy from third parties including corporations and governments on the Internet.
 Censorship – the suppression of speech, public communication, or other information, on the basis that such material is considered objectionable, harmful, sensitive, politically incorrect or "inconvenient" as determined by government authorities or by community consensus.
 Censorship by country – the extent of censorship varies between countries and sometimes includes restrictions to freedom of the Press, freedom of speech, and human rights.
 Internet censorship – the control or suppression of what can be accessed, published, or viewed on the Internet enacted by regulators or self-censorship.  
 Content control software – a type of software that restricts or controls the content an Internet user is capable to access.
 Internet censorship and surveillance by country
 Internet censorship circumvention – the use of techniques and processes to bypass filtering and censored online materials.
 Internet law – law governing the Internet, including dissemination of information and software, information security, electronic commerce, intellectual property in computing, privacy, and freedom of expression.

Internet organizations

Domain name registry or Network Information Center (NIC) – a database of all domain names and the associated registrant information in the top level domains of the Domain Name System of the Internet that allow third party entities to request administrative control of a domain name. 
Private sub-domain registry – an NIC which allocates domain names in a subset of the Domain Name System under a domain registered with an ICANN-accredited or ccTLD registry.
Internet Society (ISOC) – an American non-profit organization founded in 1992 to provide leadership in Internet-related standards, education, access, and policy.
InterNIC (historical) – the organization primarily responsible for Domain Name System (DNS) domain name allocations until 2011 when it was replaced by ICANN.
Internet Corporation for Assigned Names and Numbers (ICANN) – a nonprofit organization responsible for coordinating the maintenance and procedures of several databases related to the namespaces of the Internet, ensuring the network's stable and secure operation.
Internet Assigned Numbers Authority (IANA) – a department of ICANN which allocates domain names and maintains IP addresses.
Internet Activities Board (IAB) – 
Internet Engineering Task Force (IETF) –

Non-profit Internet organizations
Advanced Network and Services (ANS) (historical) – 
Internet2 – 
Merit Network – 
North American Network Operators' Group (NANOG) –

Commercial Internet organizations
Amazon.com – 
ANS CO+RE (historical) – 
Google – an American multinational technology company that specializes in Internet-related services and products, which include online advertising technologies, search engine, cloud computing, software, and hardware.

Cultural and societal implications of the Internet
 Sociology – the scientific study of society, including patterns of social relationships, social interaction, and culture.
 Sociology of the Internet – the application of sociological theory and methods to the Internet, including analysis of online communities, virtual worlds, and organizational and social change catalyzed through the Internet.
 Digital sociology – a sub-discipline of sociology that focuses on understanding the use of digital media as part of everyday life, and how these various technologies contribute to patterns of human behavior, social relationships and concepts of the self.
 Internet culture
 List of web awards

Underlying technology
MOSFET (MOS transistor)
CMOS (complementary MOS)
LDMOS (lateral diffused MOS)
Power MOSFET
RF CMOS (radio frequency CMOS)
Optical networking
Fiber-optic communication
Laser
Optical fiber
Telecommunications network
Modem
Telecommunication circuit
Wireless network
Base station
Cellular network
RF power amplifier
Router
Transceiver

See also

 Outline of information technology

Internet
Internet